Sachun (also Romanized as Sāchūn and Sachoon; also known as Sāchūm) is a village in Khosuyeh Rural District, in the Central District of Zarrin Dasht County, Fars Province, Iran. At the 2006 census, its population was 1,160, in 264 families.

References 

Populated places in Zarrin Dasht County